Beszowa  is a village in the administrative district of Gmina Łubnice, within Staszów County, Świętokrzyskie Voivodeship, in southern Poland.

From 1975 to 1998 the town was administratively part of the Tarnobrzeg Voivodeship.

The village has a population of  281.

Demography 
According to the 2002 Poland census, there were 279 people residing in Beszowa village, of whom 51.3% were male and 48.7% were female. In the village, the population was spread out, with 17.2% under the age of 18, 34.1% from 18 to 44, 24% from 45 to 64, and 24.7% who were 65 years of age or older.
 Figure 1. Population pyramid of village in 2002 – by age group and sexAccording to the 2011 National Census of Population and Housing, the population of the village of Beszowa is 268

References

Villages in Staszów County